Jane Slavin (born 11 March 1970) is an English actress and novelist. Slavin was the winner of the 1989 BBC Radio Drama Carleton Hobbs Award. She has appeared on television in Lewis, Doctors as Gayle Buckley, Peak Practice, Always and Everyone, Coronation Street and the Doctor Who full-cast radio drama The Paradise of Death. Slavin has also been a series regular in The Bill, Wycliffe, Maigret, Clocking Off, Casualty and Heartbeat.

She has also recorded several Big Finish productions of Doctor Who with the fourth Doctor, Tom Baker, playing the role of companion Ann Kelso. The stories were released in January 2019. Her theatre roles include Poopay in Alan Ayckbourn's Communicating Doors at the Savoy Theatre (in London's West End), and All Things Considered (Hampstead Theatre). She was Juliet in Romeo and Juliet in a world tour for the (ESC Dir. Michael Bogdanov) and famously fell off the balcony at the first preview. Her novel Writing on the Water was published in 2003 by Transworld/Black Swan.

References

External links
 

1970 births
Living people
Actresses from Salford
English stage actresses
English television actresses
21st-century English novelists
20th-century English actresses
21st-century English actresses
English radio actresses